FK POKROK SEZ Krompachy is a Slovak football team, based in the town of Krompachy.

Colours
Club colours are black and white.

External links
Official club website 
  
Club profile at Futbalnet.sk

References

Football clubs in Slovakia
Association football clubs established in 1913